The New England Forestry Foundation is a non-profit organization dedicated to preserving and sustainably managing forestland in New England. The New England Forestry Foundation acquires and stewards land through a variety of ways including partnerships, private donations, and others means.

References

External links 

 

Environmental organizations based in the United States
New England
History of forestry in the United States
Forest conservation organizations